Lewis John Hill (born 5 October 1990) is an English cricketer. Hill is a right-handed batsman and wicketkeeper. 

Educated at Hastings High School and John Cleveland College in Hinckley, Hill has played Second XI cricket for Leicestershire since 2009. During the 2012 season, Hill was selected as part of the Unicorns squad for the 2012 Clydesdale Bank 40. He made his List A debut during the competition against Northamptonshire at Sir Paul Getty's Ground, Wormsley. He was dismissed for a golden duck in the match by Lee Daggett, with Northamptonshire winning by 8 wickets. However in his next outing for the Unicorns against Warwickshire he made an impressive 35 before being dismissed by Chris Wright. 
In May 2015, Hill made his first-class début at Canterbury for Leicestershire vs Kent. He made 57 and 3 respectively. Although not being in the squad for Leicestershire's trip to Surrey, Boyce failed a late fitness test, meaning Lewis Hill was once again selected. He was chosen to open the batting. He made 126 off just 147 balls, hitting 18 fours and 2 sixes in the process.  This was his best score for ages.

In June 2015, Lewis Hill hit the winning runs to secure Leicestershire's first county championship victory in nearly three years.

References

External links

 at Leicester Mercury

1990 births
Living people
Cricketers from Leicester
English cricketers
Unicorns cricketers
Leicestershire cricketers
Wicket-keepers